DOHWA Engineering Company Limited is a privately owned engineering, construction company in South Korea. DOHWA is one of the largest engineering design firms in South Korea. Founded in 1957, the firm has completed more than 6,900 projects domestic and worldwide. The company maintains offices in over 15 countries. DOHWA has raised 277 million USD revenue in 2010, which is the first among civil engineering design firms in South Korea. And Dohwa Engineering has been ranked 106th in The Top 150 Global Design Firms List published from Engineering News-Record 2011.

DOHWA Engineering Co., LTD is publicly listed and traded on the Korean Stock Exchange under the commodities code : 002150

Offices 

 Asia (South, Southeast): Vietnam, Indonesia, Bangladesh, Pakistan, Philippines 
 CIS, Central Asia and Caucasus Region: Georgia, Kyrgyz Republic, Kazakhstan 
 Middle East & North Africa (MENA) and Southern Africa: Oman, Algeria, Mozambique 
 Americas: Colombia, Peru, Bolivia, United States, Nicaragua, Honduras

History 
 1957: DOHWA founded.
 1961 DOHWA Incorporated.
 2011 DOHWA Consulting Engineers Co., Ltd (도화종합기술공사) listed on the Korea Stock Exchange (KRX)

References

Construction and civil engineering companies established in 1957
Construction and civil engineering companies of South Korea
Companies based in Seoul
South Korean brands
South Korean companies established in 1957